Paratachardina pseudolobata, the lobate lac scale, is a polyphagous and pestiferous lac scale insect, which damages trees and woody shrubs in Cuba, Florida, the Bahamas and the Australian territory of Christmas Island. It was mistakenly identified as Paratachardina lobata (Chamberlin), an insect native to India and Sri Lanka, but was in 2007 recognized and named as a distinct species based on material from Florida; its native distribution is as yet unknown. The new lac insect was described based on all stages of the female (adult, second-instar nymph and first-instar nymph), during the revision of the genus Paratachardina, wherein all its known species were redescribed.

Biology 
The lobate lac insect is known to feed on more than 300 plant species. It reproduces parthenogenetically, in contrast with the morphologically similar P. lobata, which reproduces sexually.

Footnotes

References
 Balachowsky, A.S. (1950) Sur deux Tachardina Ckll. (Coccoidea-Lacciferinae) nouveaux du Sahara Central. [Contribution à l'étude des Coccoidea du Nord Africain, 28e note.] (In French). EOS 26, 7–17.
 Ben-Dov, Y. (2006) A systematic catalogue of eight scale insect families (Hemiptera: Coccoidea) of the world: Aclerdidae, Asterolecaniidae, Beesoniidae, Carayonemidae, Conchaspididae, Dactylopiidae, Kerriidae and Lecanodiaspididae. Elsevier, Amsterdam, 368 pp.
 Chamberlin, J.C. (1923) A systematic monograph of the Tachardiinae or lac insects (Coccidae).  Bulletin of Entomological Research, 14, 147–212.
 Chamberlin, J.C. (1925) Supplement to a monograph of the Lacciferidae (Tachardiinae) or lac insects (Homopt. Coccidae). Bulletin of Entomological Research, 16, 31–41.
 Green, E.E. (1922) The Coccidae of Ceylon, Part V. Dulau & Co., London, 472 pp.
 Green, E.E. & Mann, H.H. (1907) The Coccidae attacking the tea plant in India and Ceylon. Memoirs of the Department of Agriculture in India, Entomological Series, 1, 337–355. 
 Hamon, A.B. & Hodges, G. (2002) Pest Alert. Lobate lac scale, Paratachardina lobata lobata (Chamberlin) (Hemiptera: Kerriidae). (10 December 2006).
 Howard, F.W., Pemberton, R.W., Hodges, G.S., Steinberg, B., McLean, D. & Liu, H. (2006) Host plant range of lobate lac scale, Paratachardina lobata, in Florida. Proceedings of the Florida State Horticultural Society, 119, 398–408.
Howard  FW,  Pemberton R, Hamon AB, Hodges GS, Mannion CM, McLean D, Wofford J. (December 2008). Lobate lac scale, Paratachardina pseudolobata Kondo & Gullan. Featured Creatures. EENY-276. (9 December 2008).
 Kapur, A.P. (1958) A Catalogue of the Lac Insects (Lacciferidae, Hemiptera). Lac Cess Commission, Ranchi, India, 47 pp.
 Kondo, T. & Gullan, P.J. (2007) Taxonomic review of the lac insect genus Paratachardina Balachowsky (Hemiptera: Coccoidea: Kerriidae), with a revised key to genera of Kerriidae and description of two new species. Zootaxa 1617: 1-41.
 MacGillivray, A.D. (1921) The Coccidae. Tables for the Identification of the Subfamilies and Some of the More Important Genera and Species, together with Discussions of their Anatomy and Life History. Scarab, Urbana, Illinois, U.S.A., 502 pp.
 Mahdihassan, S. (1923a) Classification of lac insects from a physiological standpoint. Journal of the Science Association, Maharajah's College, Vizianagaram, 1, 47–99.
 Mahdihassan, S. (1923b) Observations on the life-cycles of south Indian lac insects. Indian Forester, 49, 653–663.
 Mahdihassan, S. (1946) Two varieties of Tachardina lobata. Current Science (India) 15, 135–136.
 Mannion, C., Howard, F., Hodges, G. & Hodges, A. (2005) Lobate lac scale, Paratachardina lobata (Chamberlin). Regional IPM center pest alert. Available from:  (August 18, 2005).
 Maskell, W.M. (1893) Further coccid notes: with descriptions of new species from Australia, India, Sandwich Islands, Demerara, and South Pacific. Transactions and Proceedings of the New Zealand Institute, 25(1892), 201–252.
 Maskell, W.M. (1895) Further coccid notes: with description of new species from New Zealand, Australia, Sandwich Islands, and elsewhere, and remarks upon many species already reported. Transactions and Proceedings of the New Zealand Institute, 27(1894), 36–75.
 Miller, D.R. (1991) Superfamily Coccoidea, In Stehr, F. W. (Ed), Immature Insects, Volume 2. Kendall/ Hunt Publishing Company, Iowa, U.S.A., pp. 90–111.
 Miller, D.R., Rung, A., Venable, G.L. & Gill, R.J. (2007) Scale insects: identification tools for species of quarantine importance. Other scales; Paratachardina sp. nr. lobata, ARS & APHIS, USDA. 
 Misra, A.B. (1930) On a collection of lac insects from northern India. Bulletin of Entomological Research, 21, 161–164.
 Morrison, H. (1920) The nondiaspine Coccidae of the Philippine Islands, with descriptions of apparently new species. The Philippine Journal of Science 17, 147–202.
 Morrison, H. & Morrison, E.R. (1966) An annotated list of generic names of the scale insects (Homoptera: Coccoidea). Miscellaneous Publication United States Department of Agriculture, 1015, 1–206.
 Munting, J. (1965) Lac insects (Homopera: Lacciferidae) from South Africa. Journal of the Entomological Society of Southern Africa, 28, 32–43.
 Munting, J. (1966) Lac insects (Homoptera: Lacciferidae) from South Africa. -- II. Revue de Zoologie et de Botanique Africaine, 74, 121–134.
 O'Dowd, D.J., Green, P.T. & Lake, P.S. (2003) Invasional 'meltdown' on an oceanic island. Ecology Letters, 6, 812–817.
 Pemberton, R.W. (2003). Invasion of Paratachardina lobata lobata (Hemiptera: Kerriidae) in South Florida: A snapshot sample of an infestation in a residential yard. Florida Entomologist, 86, 373–377.
 Pemberton, R.W., Nguyen, R., Winotai, A. & Howard, F.W. (2006) Host acceptance trials of Kerria lacca (Kerriidae) parasitoids from northern Thailand on the pest lobate lac scale (Paratachardina lobata) (Kerriidae). Florida Entomologist, 89, 336–339.
 Ramakrishna Ayyar, T.V. (1919) A contribution to our knowledge of South Indian Coccidae. Bulletin of the Agricultural Research Institute, Pusa, India, 87, 1–50.
 Ramakrishna Ayyar, T.V. (1921) A check list of the Coccidae of the Indian region. Proceedings of the Entomology Meetings, India, 4, 336–362.
 Varshney, R.K. (1967) A note on the several species of Indian coccids (Homopt., Coccoidea), proposed by E. E. Green as nomina nuda. Entomologist's Monthly Magazine, 102 (1223-1225), 77–79.
 Varshney, R.K. (1968) Revision of the systematics of lac insects (Tachardiidae, Homoptera), Part I - Subfamily Tachardininae. Proceedings of the 55th Indian Science Congress, Sect. 7 (Zoology & Entomology), 488–489.
 Varshney, R.K. (1977) Taxonomic studies on lac insects of India (Homoptera: Tachardiidae). Oriental Insects, Supplement 5(1976), 1–97.
 Varshney, R.K. (1984) A review of the family Tachardiidae (Kerriidae) in the Orient (Homoptera: Coccoidea). Oriental Insects, 18, 361–384.
 Varshney, R.K. (1997) An up-to-date list of the lac insects of the world. Proceedings of the National Seminar: Lac Industry—Challenges and Solutions, 27–31.
 Varshney, R.K. & Teotia, T.P.S. (1968) A supplementary list of the host-plant of lac insects. Journal of the Bombay Natural History Society, 64, 488–511.
 Wang, T.C. (1986) [A new species of Paratachardina Balachowsky (Homoptera: Coccoidea).] [In Chinese; Summary In English]. Acta Entomologica Sinica, 29(2), 196–198.
 Williams, D.J. & Watson, G.W. (1990) The Scale Insects of the Tropical South Pacific Region. Pt. 3: The soft scales (Coccidae) and other families. CAB International Institute of Entomology, London, 267 pp.

Agricultural pest insects
Insect pests of ornamental plants
Hemiptera of Asia
Kerriidae